Kay Tagal kang Hinintay is a 1998 Filipino drama romance film produced by Star Cinema, starring Judy Ann Santos and Rico Yan. The movie was directed by Rory B. Quintos, Story by Mari Mariano, Screenplay by Mari Mariano and Olivia M. Lamasan. It was Graded "A" by Cinema Evaluation Board.

Synopsis
Ana Cordero (Judy Ann Santos) is an advertising secretary and the bread winner of the family. Alex Medina (Rico Yan) on the other hand is a frustrated businessman who dreams to own his restaurant.

First met in Vigan. The two started on the wrong foot. Nonetheless became friends while on vacation. Alex and Ana finds attraction and admiration to each other nevertheless Ana declares that the feelings should be ended before they go back to the real world for there will be no room for love.

However, fate has its ways when Alex saw Ana walking on her way to work (Manila), chased and invited her to dinner. The two did not take time to become a couple. Love and cared for each other's dreams only to realize the differences and sacrifices they need to do for the love to work. Until complications came to the relationship to be quiver, Ana's family who has her choose over them or Alex and Sandy, Alex's close friend who has enduring love for him.

Cast and characters

Judy Ann Santos as Ana Cordero
Rico Yan as Alex Medina
Jennifer Sevilla as Sandy
Dante Rivero as Mr. Medina
Gloria Sevilla as Manang B
Eva Darren as Aling Celia
Nikki Valdez as Rina
Bernard Palanca as Robin
William Lorenzo as Jojo
Yayo Aguila as Letty
Minnie Aguilar as Nini

Film locations
 Vigan, Ilocos Sur, Philippines
 Tagaytay, Cavite, Philippines
 Manila, Metro Manila, Philippines

Soundtrack
Kay Tagal
Words and Music by Andrei Dionisio
Courtesy of Alpha Records Corporation
Recorded by April Boy Regino

References

External links
 

1998 films
Filipino-language films
Star Cinema romance films
Philippine romance films
1990s romance films
Films directed by Rory Quintos